The Coconut Festival is a week-long celebration in San Pablo, Laguna, Philippines, in honor of their patron Saint Paul the Hermit. It is held every first to second week of January. It is a celebration started in 1996. The festival consists of Street dancing, float parade, street concerts, nightly programs before the city fiesta and some other important events like the yearly "Mutya at Lakan ng San Pablo".

San Pablo City's Coconut Festival also known as Coco Fest gives more colors to the city fiesta which is held every 15 January. It attracts people nearby towns and foreigners as well as local and national media. This boosts the culture and traditions of San Pablenos. The festival also earned citation from the Association of tourism Officers of the Philippines (ATOP) and the Department of Tourism (DOT) as the best tourism Event for Festival Category City Level for Calendar Year 2010-2011-2012-2013 (PIA) which placed San Pablo City, a tourist destination.

The city's "Coconut Festival" garnered 2013's "Pearl Award" as Hall of Famer during the 14th National Convention of the Department of Tourism (DOT)–Association of Tourism Officers of the Philippines (ATOP) held in Legazpi City, Albay.

Street Dancing

The Coconut Festival Street Dancing is a competition among schools within San Pablo City. The competition is divided in three divisions: Elementary, Secondary and the College Divisions. During the early festivals, costumes were 90% made from coconut trees. But later on, it was decided that costumes may not be much from coconut. Also, music used in the early festivals is different. It is more on a tribal beat. Some of the used music/songs in the street dancing were: "Follow the Leader" in 1998; "Da Coconut Nut" in 2000-2002 and some remix songs on 2003–2008. But in 2009 and until now, San Pablo City Coconut Festival street dancing is using "Mabuhay ang San Pablo" (Long live the city) song and its remix versions.

Street Dancing Winners

1 - Representative to the 1st La Laguna Festival Street Dancing Competition. Laguna is the province where San Pablo City belongs.
2 - Only one delegation participated in the College/University Division
3 - Invited to perform at the SMX Travel Tour Expo to be held on 14 to 16 February 2014.

Special awards

- In 2013 and 2017, only one delegate participated in the College/University Division.

Float Parade

The street dancing competition is preceded by the float parade. It was first held in 1996. It is also a competition open to local and private sectors including schools and organizations. During the 90's, Coconut Festival float parade was held a day before the street dancing competition. It was a separate event but due to the growing number of events and programs during the long-week festival, organizers joint the float parade and the street dancing competition in a one big spectacular day usually held on 13 January.

Coco Art Festival
diverse range of human activities in creating visual, auditory or performing artifacts (artworks), expressing the author's imaginative or technical skill, intended to be appreciated for their beauty or emotional power.

Coco Carnival Queen
The Coco Carnival Queen during the Coco Fest also takes the limelight of the festival. The event showcases the creativity of San Pablo by making festive gowns and costumes purely made from the coconut tree. In the early Coco Festivals, this was not a competition. And as time lapses, costumes for the Coco Carnival Queen become bigger, bolder and impressive.

External links
 Official Website of San Pablo City, Laguna, Philippines

References 

Cultural festivals in the Philippines
San Pablo, Laguna
Culture of Laguna (province)
Tourist attractions in Laguna (province)